, sometimes called  or  was the castle of the Bingo-Fukuyama Han during the Edo period of Japanese history.
The castle is located in Fukuyama Park in Fukuyama, Hiroshima near Fukuyama Station.

Overview
The castle was built on a hill on the Fukuyama plain and it was the capital of Bingo Fukuyama Han. Construction was started in 1619 during the Genna era, and was completed in 1622. The castle was created by Mizuno Katsunari, one of the first Tokugawa hereditary vassals, on order by the Tokugawa shōgun. The castle stood seven stories tall, and was surrounded by double moats which provided an inlet to the Seto Inland Sea. The Mizuno clan maintained control over the castle from its construction until 1700.

Fukuyama Castle was one of the tenshu that survived the Meiji Restoration, however it suffered extensive damage from Allied attacks in World War II; most buildings of the castle were destroyed.  Most of the dry stone was later removed, and Fukuyama Station was built very near where the castle stood.  The main tower was rebuilt with concrete in 1966.

Gallery

See also
Japanese castle

References

Literature

External links

Castles in Hiroshima Prefecture
Fukuyama, Hiroshima
Houses completed in 1622
1622 establishments in Japan
Buildings and structures in Japan destroyed during World War II